The Rexroad Formation is a geologic formation in Kansas. It preserves fossils dating back to the Neogene period. These fossils include two types of skunk (Spilogale rexroadi and Brachyprotoma breviramus), a tree bat (Lasiurus fossilis), a ringtail (Bassariscus casei), several snakes, such as Elaphe obsoleta, and a turkey (Agriocharis progenes).

See also

 List of fossiliferous stratigraphic units in Kansas
 Paleontology in Kansas

References
 

Neogene geology of Kansas
Neogene geology of Oklahoma